Gustav Olofsson (born 1 December 1994) is a Swedish professional ice hockey defenceman. He is currently playing for the Coachella Valley Firebirds in the American Hockey League (AHL) while under contract to the Seattle Kraken of the National Hockey League (NHL).  Olofsson was selected by the Minnesota Wild in the second round (46th overall) of the 2013 NHL Entry Draft.

Playing career
On 24 March 2014, following one season of NCAA play with Colorado College, the Minnesota Wild of the National Hockey League (NHL) signed Olofsson to a three-year entry-level contract starting with the 2014–15 season, but was immediately assigned to begin his professional career with the Iowa Wild in the American Hockey League (AHL).  Olofsson was called up to the NHL for the first time on November 19, 2015, where he subsequently made his debut that night in a 4–2 loss to the Boston Bruins.

In June 2017, Olofsson signed a two-year, $1.45 million contract with the Wild.

On October 3, 2018, Olofsson was traded to the Montreal Canadiens in exchange for prospect William Bitten.

Oloffson spent three seasons within the Canadiens organization, before leaving as a free agent to sign a one-year, two-way contract with expansion club, the Seattle Kraken, on 25 August 2021.

International play
Olofsson played with Sweden at the 2014 World Junior Ice Hockey Championships where he was his team's top scoring defenseman. He helped Sweden capture the Silver medal finishing with 5 points in 7 games.

Personal life
His younger brother, Fredrik, was drafted by the Chicago Blackhawks in the 2014 NHL Entry Draft and plays within the Dallas Stars organization.

Career statistics

Regular season and playoffs

International

Awards and honours

References

External links

1994 births
Living people
Charlotte Checkers (2010–) players
Coachella Valley Firebirds players
Colorado College Tigers men's ice hockey players
Green Bay Gamblers players
Iowa Wild players
Laval Rocket players
Minnesota Wild draft picks
Minnesota Wild players
Montreal Canadiens players
Seattle Kraken players
Swedish ice hockey defencemen
People from Borås
Sportspeople from Västra Götaland County